Bryon Widner is an American former white power skinhead.

Involvement with skinhead movement
Widner became a skinhead at the age of 14, and he spent 16 years involved with white supremacist organizations in the midwestern United States. Described as a "pit bull", Widner co-founded Vinlanders Social Club, a white power group in Indiana that soon gained a reputation for excessive violence.  This organization became one of the fastest-growing racist skinhead organizations in the US.

Tattoo removal
Widner's efforts to rejoin wider society were significantly hampered by his extensive facial tattoos, many of which were violent or racist. His wife feared that Widner would take drastic action to remove the tattoos, such as immersing his face in acid. She eventually contacted anti-racist activist Daryle Lamont Jenkins of One People's Project who put him in contact with the Southern Poverty Law Center (SPLC).

After "several weeks of conversation," SPLC representatives agreed to help Widner in his quest to remove his facial tattoos. They found a plastic surgeon who was willing to perform the procedure, and an anonymous donor provided $35,000 for the procedures.

See also

References

Living people
Year of birth missing (living people)